Petra Riedel (born 17 September 1964 in Magdeburg) is a German former swimmer who competed in the 1980 Summer Olympics.

References

1964 births
Living people
German female swimmers
German female backstroke swimmers
Olympic swimmers of East Germany
Swimmers at the 1980 Summer Olympics
Olympic bronze medalists for East Germany
Olympic bronze medalists in swimming
Sportspeople from Magdeburg
Medalists at the 1980 Summer Olympics